Matapa aria, the common redeye, is a butterfly belonging to the family Hesperiidae found in India and Southeast Asia.

Description

Male and female chocolate brown.

Male. Upperside, pale brown; forewing with a short impressed comma-like grey streak obliquely beneath the cell. Cilia yellowish white. Underside bright ferruginous brown. Palpi ferruginous brown.

Female. Upperside dark chocolate brown without the impressed streak; cilia of hindwing pale orange yellow. Underside bright ferruginous brown.

The larvae feed on Bambusa striata, Ochlandra travancorica and Ochlandra scriptoria.

References

Erionotini
Butterflies of Asia
Butterflies of Singapore
Butterflies of Indochina